Ramensky District is an administrative and municipal district (raion), one of the thirty-six in Moscow Oblast, Russia. It is located in the southeastern central part of the oblast. Its administrative center is the town of Ramenskoye. Population: 256,375 (2010 Census);  The population of Ramenskoye accounts for 66.2% of the district's total population.

The cities of Zhukovsky and Bronnitsy with localities under their jurisdictions, while surrounded by the district's territory, are administratively and municipally separate from it (Zhukovsky since 1952 and Bronnitsy since 1992).

References

Notes

Sources

External links

Districts of Moscow Oblast